The Mayor of Berbera is the executive of the municipal government in Berbera City and the surrounding city's territory administration. The current mayor is Abdishakur Mohamoud Hassan, who took office on 20 December 2012.

List of mayors

See also

 Mayor of Hargeisa
 Mayor of  Burao
 Mayor of Borama
 Mayor of Las Anod
 Mayor of Erigavo

References

Mayors of places in Somaliland